Skarpengland is a village in Vennesla municipality in Agder county, Norway.

Skarpengland was the administrative centre of the old municipality of Øvrebø from 1838 until 1964 when it was merged into Vennesla municipality.

References

Villages in Agder
Vennesla